Tolpia unguis is a moth of the family Erebidae first described by Michael Fibiger in 2007. It is known from mid-western Thailand.

The wingspan is 13–14 mm. The hindwing is dark brown and the underside unicolorous brown.

References

Micronoctuini
Taxa named by Michael Fibiger
Moths described in 2007